The following is a list of Malayalam films released in the year 1984.

Dubbed films

References

 1984
1984
Malayalm
Fil